The Tundzha is a river in Bulgaria and Turkey (known in antiquity as the Tonsus) and the most significant tributary of the Maritsa, emptying into it on Turkish territory near Edirne.

The river takes its source from the central parts of Stara Planina north of Kalofer, it then flows east and makes a sharp turn to the south before Yambol, in which direction it flows until it reaches the Maritsa. The Tundzha's length is about 365 km, of which 328 km on Bulgarian territory (including border). It has about 50 tributaries, the more important of which Mochuritsa, Popovska and Sinapovska.

Towns on the banks of the river include Kalofer, Yambol and Elhovo.

Honour
Tundzha Glacier on Livingston Island in the South Shetland Islands, Antarctica is named after Tundzha River.

Galleries
Pictures of Tundzha River in Yambol:

Pictures of Tundzha River near Elhovo:

References

Rivers of Bulgaria
Rivers of Turkey
Landforms of Edirne Province
International rivers of Europe
Landforms of Yambol Province